William George Prest (2 April 1926 – 8 December 2012) was a member of the Queensland Legislative Assembly for the Labor Party from 1976 until 1992, former Gladstone Harbour Board member and once Gladstone City Council mayor.

Early life
Prest was born in Longreach, Queensland. In 1970, he stood for local council elections and was elected, he later became Gladstone's deputy mayor in 1975.

Political career
After being elected he served as Shadow Minister Tourism, Marine Services and Fisheries	until December 1977, then Shadow Minister for Main Roads, Shadow Minister for Local Government and Valuation and Shadow Minister for Transport.

In his last term in the Queensland Parliament, Prest caused controversy when he made a racist slur against former state National Party Aboriginal Affairs Minister and future Federal MP Bob Katter when he called him a gin jockey. Prest however was not publicly disciplined and retained his position as whip but the controversy did see him being taken about out of the limelight of public life.

The Gladstone Port Access Bridge was renamed the Bill Prest Bridge in 2010.

Personal life
Prest died, aged 86, in Gladstone, Queensland. Robert Schwarten, Liz Cunningham, deputy mayor Matt Burnett and mayor Gail Sellers attended his funeral to pay tribute.

Prest was survived by his wife Patricia, son Darryl Prest and daughters Patricia Hick and Liz Fallon.

References

1926 births
2012 deaths
Members of the Queensland Legislative Assembly
Australian Labor Party members of the Parliament of Queensland